|}
{| class="collapsible collapsed" cellpadding="0" cellspacing="0" style="clear:right; float:right; text-align:center; font-weight:bold;" width="280px"
! colspan="3" style="border:1px solid black; background-color: #77DD77;" | Also Ran

The 1988 Epsom Derby was a horse race which took place at Epsom Downs on Wednesday 1 June 1988. It was the 209th running of the Derby, and it was won by Kahyasi. The winner was ridden by Ray Cochrane and trained by Luca Cumani. The pre-race favourite Red Glow finished fourth.

Race details
 Sponsor: Ever Ready
 Winner's prize money: £296,500
 Going: Good
 Number of runners: 14
 Winner's time: 2m 33.84s

Full result

* The distances between the horses are shown in lengths or shorter. hd = head; nk = neck.† Trainers are based in Great Britain unless indicated.

Winner's details
Further details of the winner, Kahyasi:

 Foaled: April 2, 1985, in Ireland
 Sire: Ile de Bourbon; Dam: Kadissya (Blushing Groom)
 Owner: HH Aga Khan IV
 Breeder: HH Aga Khan IV
 Rating in 1988 International Classifications: 126

Form analysis

Two-year-old races
Notable runs by the future Derby participants as two-year-olds in 1987.

 Glacial Storm – 1st Horris Hill Stakes
 Sheriff's Star – 2nd Futurity Stakes
 Unfuwain – 1st Haynes, Hanson and Clark Stakes
 Minster Son – 5th Horris Hill Stakes
 Project Manager – 1st Tyros Stakes, 4th National Stakes
 Clifton Chapel – 6th Prix Saint-Roman

The road to Epsom
Early-season appearances in 1988 and trial races prior to running in the Derby.

 Kahyasi – 1st Lingfield Derby Trial
 Glacial Storm – 2nd Sandown Classic Trial, 3rd Dante Stakes
 Doyoun – 1st Craven Stakes, 1st 2,000 Guineas
 Red Glow – 2nd Newmarket Stakes, 1st Dante Stakes
 Kefaah – 1st Feilden Stakes, 2nd Dante Stakes
 Sheriff's Star – 2nd Predominate Stakes
 Unfuwain – 1st Warren Stakes, 1st Chester Vase
 Minster Son – 1st Newmarket Stakes, 1st Predominate Stakes
 Project Manager – 1st Gowran Classic Trial, 6th Irish 2,000 Guineas, 1st Gallinule Stakes
 Al Mufti – 5th European Free Handicap, 3rd Predominate Stakes
 Charmer – 2nd European Free Handicap, 2nd 2,000 Guineas
 Clifton Chapel – 1st Dee Stakes
 Maksud – 3rd Sandown Classic Trial, 2nd Derrinstown Stud Derby Trial

Subsequent Group 1 wins
Group 1 / Grade I victories after running in the Derby.

 Kahyasi – Irish Derby (1988)
 Sheriff's Star – Coronation Cup (1989), Grand Prix de Saint-Cloud (1989)
 Minster Son – St. Leger (1988)

Subsequent breeding careers
Leading progeny of participants in the 1988 Epsom Derby.

Sires of Classic winners
Unfuwain (7th)
 Bolas - 1st Irish Oaks (1994)
 Lahan - 1st 1000 Guineas Stakes (2000)
 Petrushka - 1st Irish Oaks (2000)
 Lailani - 1st Irish Oaks (2001)
 Eswarah - 1st Epsom Oaks (2005)
Kahyasi (1st)
 Vereva - 1st Prix de Diane (1997) 
 Zainta - 1st Prix de Diane (1998)
 Hasili - Dam of Dansili, Banks Hill, Heat Haze (1st Beverly D. Stakes 2003), Intercontinental, Cacique, Champs Elysees and Deluxe (2nd Prix Saint-Alary 2010)
 Paddy's Return - 1st Triumph Hurdle (1996), 1st Champion Stayers Hurdle (1997). 1st Long Walk Hurdle (1997)
Doyoun (3rd)
 Daylami - 1st Poule d'Essai des Poulains (1997)
 Margarula - 1st Irish Oaks (2002)
 Kalanisi - Cartier Champion Older Horse (2000)
 Mistinguett - 1st Cleeve Hurdle (1998)

Sires of National Hunt horses
Glacial Storm (2nd)
 Alexander Banquet - 1st Hennessy Cognac Gold Cup (2002)
 Gunther McBride - 1st Racing Post Chase (2002)
 Kates Charm - 1st Cleeve Hurdle 2002
 Tempest Belle - Dam of Monalee
Minster Son (8th)
 Rambling Minster - 1st Blue Square Gold Cup (2009)
 Minster Glory - 2nd Castleford Chase (2001)
 Ross Comm - 1st Cumberland Handicap Chase (2005)

Other Stallions
Sheriff's Star (6th) - Seuin Sky (1st Kikuka-shō 1998)Charmer (11th) - Passion For Life (1st Abernant Stakes 1996), Quinze (1st Galway Hurdle 1999)Kefaah (5th) - Dr Leunt (1st Rehearsal Chase 1999) - Exported to South AfricaAl Mufti (10th) - Exported to South Africa - Victory Moon (3rd Dubai World Cup 2004), Captail Al - Champion Sire in South AfricaRed Glow (4th) - Exported to New Zealand - Mr Mutual Respect (3rd Australian Guineas 1994)Project Manager (9th) - Strong Project (1st Phil Sweeney Memorial Chase 2006)

References

External links
 Colour Chart – Derby 1988

Epsom Derby
 1988
Epsom Derby
Epsom Derby
20th century in Surrey